The Palazzo Bolognetti-Torlonia, today demolished, was a palace located in Piazza Venezia, Rome, Italy.

It was acquired in 1807 by Marino Torlonia, who added numerous art pieces. The palace underwent restoration by the architect Giovanni Battista Caretti. The frescoes were restored by Francesco Podestà. Employed in the restoration and sculptural decoration were Canova, Thorvaldsen, Tenerani, and Cognetti.
Among guests to the palace in those days were the King of Bavaria, Russia aristocrats, and the rulers of Baden.

The building was demolished in 1903, to improve the vista of the Monument to Vittorio Emanuele II from Via del Corso. Before the destruction the pieces and decoration of the palace were photographed, the frescoes on the walls and furniture were sold, while some of the furniture and fresco panels are now in the Museo di Roma at Palazzo Braschi.

The main floor of the palace featured the Gallery of Theseus, the Room of Psyche, the Room of Diana and the Visitors' Room  (now reconstructed at Palazzo Braschi). Another wing of the palace  was called Gallery dell' Ercole, by Canova, taking its name from the group of statues of the “Lica Heracles” by Antonio Canova, today at the Galleria Nazionale di Arte Moderna also in Rome. It was a mix of museum and reception room with paints and decoration in plaster, mirrors, furniture, silver elements, copies of ancient Greek and Roman sculptures.

Bibliography 
 Majanlahti, Anthony, and Amedeo Osti Guerrazzi. Roma divisa 1919-1925: Itinerari, storie, immagini. Il Saggiatore, 2014.
 Carlo Fea. Nuova descrizione di Roma antica e moderna, e de'suoi contorni. 1820.

Bolognetti-Torlonia
Demolished buildings and structures in Rome
Buildings and structures demolished in 1903